NGC 6373 is a barred spiral galaxy located in the constellation Draco. It is designated as SBc in the galaxy morphological classification scheme and was discovered by the American astronomer Lewis A. Swift on 13 June 1885. There are two recorded supernovae in this galaxy designated SN 2001ad and SN 2012an.

References

External links 
 
 

Barred spiral galaxies
Draco (constellation)
6373